Grigore Turcuman (20 October 1890 – 28 May 1942) was a Bessarabian Romanian politician. As a member of Sfatul Țării (the Bessarabian Parliament), he voted the Union of Bessarabia with the Kingdom of Romania on 27 March 1918.

Biography
Turcuman was born in a Romanian (Moldavian) family from Tătărăuca Nouă, Soroksky Uyezd, Bessarabia Governorate. He served as Navy officer in the Imperial Russian Navy (Black Sea naval force), during World War I. After the beginning of the Russian Revolution, he came back to Bessarabia, being elected on 21 November 1917 Member of Sfatul Țării (the Moldovan Parliament), as representative of the Bessarabian Romanian soldiers and officers, serving until 1918. Representing the opinion of the majority, he voted the Union of Bessarabia with the Kingdom of Romania on 27 March 1918.

Later he advanced in rank to Navy Captain (in reserve), in the Black Sea Division of the Romanian Royal Navy. As member of the Romanian National Liberal Party, Turcuman served in the administration of Soroca County, being sub-Prefect between 1933 and 1937. After the Soviet occupation of Bessarabia and Northern Bukovina in June 1940, he was 
arrested by the Soviet NKVD on July 2, 1940. Prosecuted for his political activity as Romanian Unionist, he was sent to the Gulag, where he perished in May 1942 at the hospital of Prison No. 1 in Penza.

Gallery

Notes

Bibliography
 Sărbătoarea Basarabiei. Deschiderea celui dintâiu Sfat al Țării, la Chișinău, în ziua de 21 Noemvrie 1917. Extras din Gazeta "Ardealul" Nr. 9. Chișinău, Tipografia Soc. Culturale a Românilor din Basarabia, 1917 (p. 17, 126).
 Dimitrie Bogos, La răspântie. Moldova de la Nistru între anii 1917-1918. Chișinău, Editura Soc. "Glasul Țării", 1924 (p. 72, 84, 112).
 Chiriac, Alexandru, Membrii Sfatului Țării. 1917-1918. Dicționar, Editura Fundației Culturale Române, București, 2001. 
 Gheorghe E. Cojocaru, Sfatul țării: itinerar, Civitas, Chișinău, 1998,  
 Mihai Tașcă, Sfatul Țării și actualele autorități locale, Timpul de dimineață, no. 114 (849), June 27, 2008 (page 16).
 Iurie Colesnic, Sfatul Țării. Enciclopedie, Chișinău, Casa Cărții "Petru Movilă", Editura Museum, 1998, p. 292.
 "Eliberați" pentru a fi nimiciți (grupaj): Grigorii Turcuman, in "Moldova suverană", nr. 96, 24 iunie 1993, p. 3.

External links
 Arhiva pentru Sfatul Țării
 Deputații Sfatului Țării și Lavrenti Beria

1890 births
1942 deaths
Romanian people of Moldovan descent
People from Soroca District
Moldovan MPs 1917–1918
People who died in the Gulag
National Liberal Party (Romania) politicians
People from Soroksky Uyezd